The 2020–21 figure skating season began on July 1, 2020, and ended on June 30, 2021. During this season, elite skaters competed on the ISU Championship level at the 2021 World Championships. They also competed in elite events such as the Grand Prix series and the ISU Challenger Series.

Due to the COVID-19 pandemic, the ISU cancelled the Junior Grand Prix series and the Grand Prix Final. All ISU Championships events (2021 European, Four Continents, and World Junior Championships) except for Worlds were also cancelled.

Impact of the COVID-19 pandemic 
On May 1, 2020, the International Skating Union established a working group, chaired by ISU Vice-President for Figure Skating Alexander Lakernik, to monitor the ongoing COVID-19 pandemic. Its responsibilities include determining the feasibility of holding events as scheduled, possibly behind closed doors, during the first half of the season and the financial impact of any potential cancellations. On August 31, the ISU published the official Guidelines for ISU Events During the COVID-19 Pandemic.

On July 9, the General Administration of Sport of China announced that no international sporting events would be held in China in 2020, except for 2022 Winter Olympics test events. The Chinese Skating Association was scheduled to host several events during the season, including the Asian Open Trophy, Cup of China, the Grand Prix Final, and the World Junior Championships; the Grand Prix Final, to be hosted in Beijing, is the only event exempt from the Chinese government's ruling, due to its status as the test event for the Olympic Games. On July 13, the International Skating Union announced that the 2020 Cup of China remained scheduled as planned.

On July 20, the ISU officially cancelled the Junior Grand Prix series, citing increased travel and entry requirements between countries and potentially excessive sanitary & health care costs for hosting members. Over half of the events of the 2020–21 ISU Challenger Series were also either cancelled by the host federations or postponed to an unspecified later date. The Challenger Series events were held as individual events, and thus did not award prize money based on overall series rank.

On August 4, the ISU confirmed that the 2020–21 Grand Prix series would proceed as scheduled during the fall, but each event would mainly invite skaters located domestically in an effort to limit travel during the global pandemic. The Grand Prix events were heavily modified to accommodate ongoing travel restrictions and the series' culminating event, the 2020–21 Grand Prix Final, was postponed from its original date of December 10–13 in Beijing, China. On October 14, 2020, the second event in the Grand Prix series, the 2020 Skate Canada International, was cancelled by the host federation. On October 19, 2020, the fourth event in the series, the 2020 Internationaux de France, was also cancelled. In November, the Grand Prix Final was first removed from being held in China altogether, before being definitively cancelled on December 10, 2020. The ISU later rescheduled the Beijing test event to the 2021 Asian Open Figure Skating Trophy in October.

On October 16, the ISU announced the cancellation of the 2021 Four Continents Championships. On November 24, the 2021 World Junior Championships were also cancelled. On December 10, the 2021 European Championships became the third ISU Championships event of the season to be cancelled. The 2021 World Championships were held as scheduled in Stockholm, Sweden from March 22–28, although three positive COVID-19 cases were detected during the event. In addition, the ISU slightly modified the qualification rules to allow additional skaters the opportunity to meet the minimum TES requirements.

Due to the vast difference in skaters' travel restrictions, the ISU determined that it would be unfair to award ISU World Standings and Season's World Ranking points at the Challenger Series and Grand Prix. Thus, the 2021 World Championships was the only event to affect the 2020–21 ISU World Standings and Season's World Ranking. As the Junior Grand Prix and 2021 World Junior Championships were cancelled, junior skaters had no opportunities to earn World Standing Points for the season.

Scores earned at the domestic Grand Prix events did not count as official ISU scores for the purposes of achieving minimum TES requirements or as personal/season's bests. Thus, the season's best scores list was composed entirely of scores earned on the Challenger Series, where 2020 CS Nebelhorn Trophy and 2020 CS Budapest Trophy were the only two of ten scheduled events to be held, the 2021 World Championships, and the 2021 World Team Trophy.

ISU member nations' response 
On July 13, the Japan Skating Federation announced that it would not assign any skaters to the Junior Grand Prix and Challenger Series events, assuming the competitions proceeded as scheduled.

National championships 

Several countries postponed or cancelled their national championships. U.S. Figure Skating relocated the 2021 U.S. Championships to be able to create an isolated bubble environment.

Season notes

Age eligibility 
Skaters are eligible to compete in ISU events on the junior or senior levels according to their age:

Changes 

If skaters of different nationalities team up, the ISU requires that they choose one country to represent.Date refers to date when the change occurred or, if not available, the date when the change was announced.

Partnership changes

Retirements

Coaching changes

Nationality changes

Competitions 

Scheduled competitions:

Key

Cancelled and postponed events 
Numerous competitions were cancelled by either the ISU, the host federation, or the local government due to the COVID-19 pandemic. Several competitions were postponed to unspecified dates due to the COVID-19 pandemic, but were never officially cancelled or rescheduled.

The 2021 Winter Universiade and the 2021 European Youth Olympic Winter Festival, originally scheduled for January 21–31, 2021 and February 6–13, 2021, respectively, were both postponed to the following season. The IISF Ice Mall Cup was also postponed to the following season, after being rescheduled from February to September 2021.

International medalists

Men

Ladies

Pairs

Ice dance

Season's best scores

Men

Best total score

Best short program score

Best free skating score

Ladies

Best total score

Best short program score

Best free skating score

Pairs

Best total score

Best short program score

Best free skating score

Ice dance

Best total score

Best rhythm dance score

Best free dance score

Standings and ranking

Current standings (top 30)

Men 
.

Ladies 
.

Pairs 
.

Ice dance 
.

Notes

References 

Seasons in figure skating

Figure skating
Impact of the COVID-19 pandemic on the 2022 Winter Olympics